Moqitalu (also Romanized as Moqītālū, Meqī Ţālū, and Meqīţālū; also known as Moghitaloo, Mowqatez, Mugaiz, Mukatel’, Mūqatel, and Mūqātol) is a village in Anzal-e Shomali Rural District, Anzal District, Urmia County, West Azerbaijan Province, Iran. At the 2006 census, its population was 42, in 15 families.

References 

Populated places in Urmia County